The Bishop of Connor is an episcopal title which takes its name after the village of Connor in County Antrim, Northern Ireland. The title is currently used by the Church of Ireland, but in the Roman Catholic Church it has been united with another bishopric.

History
The diocese of Connor was one of the twenty-four dioceses established at the Synod of Rathbreasail in 1111. It is located in the northeast corner of Ireland and includes much of the city of Belfast. By some of the Irish annalists it was called by its territorial name The See of Dalaradia.

For a brief period in the early 12th-century, the see of Connor was united with Down under Máel Máedóc Ua Morgair (Saint Malachy), who also was Archbishop of Armagh. On 29 July 1439, plans for a permanent union of the two sees were submitted to King Henry VI of England for his sanction. Exactly twelve months later, 29 July 1439, Pope Eugene IV issued a papal bull stating that Down and Connor were to be united on the death or resignation of either bishop.  In 1442, John Sely, Bishop of Down, was deprived of his see by Pope Eugene IV, thereby effecting the union of the two dioceses. John Fossade, who had been bishop of Connor since 1431, became the bishop of the united see of Down and Connor in late 1442. However, due to strong opposition to the union in the diocese of Down, three more bishops of Down were appointed before the two sees finally united.

After the Reformation, the united see of Down and Connor had parallel episcopal successions. In the Roman Catholic Church, they still remain united to the present today. In the Church of Ireland, Down and Connor were united further with Dromore in 1842 to form the bishopric of Down, Connor and Dromore. They continued until 1945 when they were separated into the bishopric of Down and Dromore and the bishopric of Connor.

Present bishop
The present bishop is George Davison, previously Archdeacon of Belfast, who was elected by the House of Bishops in February 2020, and consecrated on 3 September 2020.

List of bishops

Pre-Reformation bishops

Church of Ireland bishops

See also

 Bishop of Down
 Bishop of Down and Connor
 Bishop of Down, Connor and Dromore
 Bishop of Down and Dromore
 Roman Catholic Diocese of Down and Connor

References

External links
 Church of Ireland Diocese of Connor (Official website)
 Christ Church Cathedral, Lisburn
 St Anne's Cathedral, Belfast

 
Connor
Connor
Religion in County Antrim
Roman Catholic Diocese of Down and Connor
Bishops of Down or Connor or of Dromore
Former Roman Catholic bishoprics in Ireland
Diocese of Connor